Mark Paul Robert Paterson (born 3 June 1998) is a Filipino British actor, singer, television host and footballer based in the Philippines.

Biography
Paterson was born in England. He is of Filipino and British descent. He is the only child of Pangasinan entrepreneur Norma Mario Paterson and former British Air Force pilot George Trevor Paterson. He started playing football at the age of six and looks up to the renowned football player Cristiano Ronaldo. 

In 2007, he moved to Manila and enrolled at Reedley International School. He had started learning to speak Tagalog, was sent back to England, and returned to the Philippines in 2016 where he is studying Hospitality Management at Enderun Colleges. While in college, he played professionally for the Kaya F.C. Elite.

He was scouted by a manager, which began his career in the entertainment industry. One of his first hosting gigs was as a VJ of MTV Philippines, where he presented programs such as MTV Philippines Fuel.

Personal life
He was in a relationship with actress Janella Salvador.

On October 20, 2020, Salvador gave birth to their son Jude in Bath, Somerset, England. A YouTube video titled Hey, Jude released on January 5, 2021 documented her pregnancy journey.

Filmography

Television/Digital

Film

See also
Iñigo Pascual
Jameson Blake
Sue Ramirez
Tony Labrusca
BoybandPH
Pinoy Boyband Superstar

References

External links

1998 births
Living people
Filipino male film actors
21st-century Filipino male singers
Filipino male models
ABS-CBN personalities
Male actors from Metro Manila
Filipino people of British descent
British people of Filipino descent
Filipino male television actors